Epsom is a suburb of Auckland, New Zealand. It is located in the centre of the Auckland isthmus between Mount Eden and Greenlane, south of Newmarket, and five km south of Auckland CBD.

Demographics

Epsom had a population of 19,428 at the 2018 New Zealand census, an increase of 36 people (0.2%) since the 2013 census, and an increase of 1,323 people (7.3%) since the 2006 census. There were 5,904 households, comprising 9,285 males and 10,140 females, giving a sex ratio of 0.92 males per female, with 2,856 people (14.7%) aged under 15 years, 5,271 (27.1%) aged 15 to 29, 8,640 (44.5%) aged 30 to 64, and 2,667 (13.7%) aged 65 or older.

Ethnicities were 47.2% European/Pākehā, 4.2% Māori, 2.9% Pacific peoples, 48.9% Asian, and 3.3% other ethnicities. People may identify with more than one ethnicity.

The percentage of people born overseas was 50.3, compared with 27.1% nationally.

Although some people chose not to answer the census's question about religious affiliation, 47.6% had no religion, 32.5% were Christian, 0.1% had Māori religious beliefs, 6.2% were Hindu, 2.4% were Muslim, 4.3% were Buddhist and 2.3% had other religions.

Of those at least 15 years old, 7,251 (43.8%) people had a bachelor's or higher degree, and 1,314 (7.9%) people had no formal qualifications. 3,912 people (23.6%) earned over $70,000 compared to 17.2% nationally. The employment status of those at least 15 was that 7,908 (47.7%) people were employed full-time, 2,442 (14.7%) were part-time, and 570 (3.4%) were unemployed.

Notable features
Named after the town in England noted for its horse-racing, Epsom also has a race track. The Alexandra Park Raceway lies in the south-eastern quarter of Epsom where it is located next to the Epsom Showgrounds. The broad, flat pastureland here at the intersection of Green Lane West and Manukau Roads was used for sporting events from the 1850s onwards but the two venues were only formally established around 1900. The Alexandra Raceway was named after the Princess of Wales later Queen Alexandra. The Epsom Showgrounds host the annual Auckland Royal Easter Show.

The major road running through Epsom is Manukau Road. Manukau Road links central Auckland on the east coast with its airport and its west coast harbour, the port of neighbouring Onehunga. It was one of the  19th century's main routes south from Auckland. The main route was  Great South Road which forms Epsom's north-eastern boundary with Remuera. The link to the Port of Onehunga meant Manukau Road became the route for horse buses, horse trams and, after 1902, electric trams. A large number of suburban houses and villas were built along it.

Several large residences were built in Epsom's open country during the mid to late 19th century surrounded by large estates and smaller working farms. As these were subdivided towards the end of the 19th century the landscape changed dramatically. One major landowner, Dr John Logan Campbell, gave a large portion of his estate to the city and that is now Cornwall Park.

Epsom's most notable parks and reserves are the volcanic cone of Mount Saint John and Marivare Reserve at the intersection of Manukau and Ranfurly Roads with a War Memorial in the form of an arch made of Volcanic rock together with sports grounds Melville Park and Windmill Park.  As well as reserves located in Epsom itself the suburb is ringed with public parks often given to the city by Epsom residents.

To the west is Mt Eden with the Mount Eden Domain. To the east is Cornwall Park and One Tree Hill Domain.

Bounding suburbs are: north Newmarket and Grafton; north-east Remuera; east Greenlane; south-east Cornwall Park; south Three Kings and Onehunga; west Sandringham and Mount Eden.

Notable buildings

 St Andrews Church – St Andrews Road. Wooden 19th-century Anglican church in the Selwyn style. Dr Purchas was vicar here. Once the centre of a rural parish this church is attended by a graveyard of significant age and importance. Little of the 1846, or 1867 churches remain, but the church has had a Category 1 listing since 1989.
Dilworth Chapel – Great South Road. Modernist chapel for a prominent boys' school.
 Rocklands Hall – 187 Gillies Avenue. A grand country residence in the French Second Empire Style designed by Auckland architect John Currie (1849–1919). The home of Thomas Bannatyne Gillies who was a farmer, lawyer, politician, judge and naturalist. He arrived in Dunedin in 1852 and served in the provincial and national parliaments during the 1860s, being elected speaker of the Otago chamber in 1861. He moved to Auckland in 1865 where he recommenced his political career; he served as Superintendent (1869–73) and as a MHR, serving briefly as colonial treasurer in 1872. He also became a Supreme Court Judge. the house was built around 1865–66, with the major addition of a ballroom in 1889. This was once a centre for hunting on Horseback when the surrounding area was largely open farmland and scrub covered countryside. Now a student hostel for the adjacent teachers' college.
 Te Unga Waka Marae – corner Clyde Street and Manukau Road.
 Epsom Library – Manukau Road. 1990s building which replaced an earlier building from 1917 built for the Epsom Road Board.
 Liberal Jewish Synagogue – Manukau Road. Modernist building from the 1950s by John Goldwater. This is one of the two Synagogues in Auckland.
 Vasanta School – Margot Street. Two storied wooden Victorian House with a turret, used by the Theosophical Society as a school.
 Marivare – Ranfurly Road. A large 19th-century country house from around 1862 built for Henry Ellis (1828–1879).  Ellis was elected to the Provincial Council in 1869. He later worked as an immigration agent and subsequently as the Immigration Officer for Auckland before becoming a Wesleyan minister in mid-life. The residence was purchased by prominent Auckland lawyer and businessman John Russell in the early 1880s and renamed Marivare. Following Russell’s death in 1894, Marivare was purchased by his eldest daughter Ada Carr. Now surrounded by suburban housing – the Carr family donated the last part of the estate to the city as a War Memorial – the Marivare Reserve.
 Former One Tree Hill Borough Council Building – Manukau Road near Ranfurly Road.
 St Cuthbert's College – Market Road. 1920s Classical building for a private girls' school.
 Epsom Post Office – Manukau Road. Arts & crafts building by the office of John Campbell from around the time of the First World War. Brick, stucco and Marsailles tile building of a type typically created by the Ministry of Works to harmonise with suburban houses.
 Campbell Memorial Fountain and Statue – Located at the Manukau Road entrance to Cornwall Park is a baroque fountain commemorating Sir John Logan Campbell. It is made of a massive pile of basalt rocks surmounted by a red granite pedestal and an over life-sized bronze statue. The sculptor, Henry Alfred Pegram (1862–1937), was based in London and worked from photographs to achieve a likeness. On discovering that the completed statue would be mounted on such a large base he increased the scale of the statue. The statue was finally unveiled on Empire Day, 24 May 1906.
 Former Tram Company Building – Greenlane. Office block built after the Electric Tram System was created in 1902 – Epsom is halfway between Auckland and Onehunga and so was a convenient place to locate the large Tram Sheds. These Sheds were demolished in the late 1970s and replaced by office buildings. The former Office block survives as a restaurant.
 Lido Cinema – Manukau Road at Greenlane. Neo-Greek building from the 1920s.
 Alexandra Park Raceway Gates – Greenlane Road. Brick, stucco and Marsailles tile lodges with wrought iron gates dating from the early 1920s.
 1905 Totaliser Building – Alexandra Park Raceway. This is a wooden structure from the early 20th century. One of the oldest surviving items on this site.
 Our Lady of the Sacred Heart – Banff Avenue. Roman Catholic Church with adjacent school.

History
Manukau Road in the centre of Epsom was originally an overland walking track used by Tāmaki Māori on the Auckland isthmus.

From the 1840s until the 1890s Epsom was noted for its rich pasture land which supported both dairy herds and grain crops. Towards Mt Eden is Windmill Road which was the site of the Bycroft Windmill.

Initially large country houses and farms dotted the landscape but from the 1890s onwards suburban development spread southwards from Newmarket across the fields of Epsom. Most of the housing in the area dates from 1900 to 1930, often large houses built solidly of wood, many in the Californian Bungalow or "Stockbroker's Tudor" styles.

The area has been long noted for its tree-lined, well-ordered streets, parks and a great variety of architecture, with century-old villas competing with late 20th-century modern housing. Following WWII increasing numbers of the larger properties were subdivided and smaller houses appeared. Since the early 1990s there has been a considerable amount of "infill" housing with clutches of townhouses altering the streetscapes in some parts of Epsom.

Education

These schools are all coeducational.

Rolls are as of 

Due to the phenomenon of the "Grammar Zone", parents wishing to live in-zone for Auckland Grammar and Epsom Girls' Grammar, housing in Epsom has become desirable and expensive. Houses within the Grammar Zone come with a premium of at least NZ$100,000 compared with an identical house just outside the Grammar Zone.

The University of Auckland Faculty of Education (formerly known as the Auckland College of Education) campus is also situated at this district. 

As a branch of Auckland Libraries, Epsom Library is located on Manukau Road, one of the main roads of the Epsom suburb.

Politics

Epsom is also the name of an electorate that includes Epsom, Remuera, Parnell, Broadway Park, and part of Balmoral. Former Auckland Mayor Christine Fletcher, was elected as Member of Parliament for Epsom in 1996. This electorate  is the wealthiest in the country, with an average income well above the national average.

The Epsom electorate has historically been a centre-right seat and, up until 2005, was considered a 'safe' seat for the National party. In 2005 the electorate elected the ACT candidate Rodney Hide, and the party has held the seat since then, in part to National softly endorsing the ACT candidates in the electorate in order for National to gain a list seat from the electorate.

The seat is currently held by David Seymour of the ACT Party. The suburb of Epsom comprises roughly 20% of the population of the Epsom electorate. At the Auckland Council, Epsom is represented by councillors for the Albert-Eden Local Board and Albert-Eden-Puketāpapa Ward.

Notable residents
 Dr Arthur Guyon Purchas (1821–1906) – clergyman, surgeon, musician; the first vicar of St Andrew's Church
 Justice Thomas Bannatyne Gillies (1828–1889) – Supreme Court judge; lived in a house called 'Rocklands Hall' on Gillies Avenue
 George Burgoyne Owens – lived in a house called 'Brightside'
 Josiah Firth – rebuilt his house 'Clifton' as a concrete castle known as Firth's Castle
 Hellaby Family – lived in a house called 'Florence Court'
 Cleghorn Family – Victoria Cleghorn, the daughter of Archibald Scott Cleghorn, was an heir apparent of the Hawaiian royal family
James Dilworth – he and his wife left their house and property as Dilworth School
 Sir Frank Mappin and Lady Mappin – donated their home 'Birchlands' as Government House, Auckland
King of Tonga – the Auckland residence of the Tongan Monarch is called 'Atalanga' and is at 183 St Andrews Road

References

Further reading
 Graham W. A. Bush (ed), The History of Epsom, Epsom & Eden District Historical Society Inc, Auckland, 2006.
 Headford C, The Lapwoods of Tuakau: The Family of Alfred Octavius Lapwood (1844–1923), 1998.

External links
Photographs of Epsom held in Auckland Libraries' heritage collections.

Suburbs of Auckland